At the 1912 International Congress of Mathematicians, Edmund Landau listed four basic problems about prime numbers. These problems were characterised in his speech as "unattackable at the present state of mathematics" and are now known as Landau's problems. They are as follows:
 Goldbach's conjecture: Can every even integer greater than 2 be written as the sum of two primes?
 Twin prime conjecture: Are there infinitely many primes p such that p + 2 is prime?
 Legendre's conjecture: Does there always exist at least one prime between consecutive perfect squares?
 Are there infinitely many primes p such that p − 1 is a perfect square? In other words: Are there infinitely many primes of the form n2 + 1?

, all four problems are unresolved.

Progress toward solutions

Goldbach's conjecture
Goldbach's weak conjecture, every odd number greater than 5 can be expressed as the sum of three primes, is a consequence of Goldbach's conjecture. Ivan Vinogradov proved it for large enough n (Vinogradov's theorem) in 1937, and Harald Helfgott extended this to a full proof of Goldbach's weak conjecture in 2013.

Chen's theorem, another weakening of Goldbach's conjecture, proves that for all sufficiently large n,  where p is prime and q is either prime or semiprime. Bordignon & Starichkova reduce this to  assuming the Generalized Riemann hypothesis for Dirichlet L-functions. Johnson and Starichkova give a version working for all n >= 4 at the cost of using a number which is the product of at most 369 primes rather than a prime or semiprime; under GRH they improve 369 to 33.

Montgomery and Vaughan showed that the exceptional set of even numbers not expressible as the sum of two primes was of density zero, although the set is not proven to be finite.

Linnik proved that large enough even numbers could be expressed as the sum of two primes and some (ineffective) constant K of powers of 2. Following many advances (see Pintz for an overview), Pintz and Ruzsa improved this to K = 8.

Twin prime conjecture
Yitang Zhang showed that there are infinitely many prime pairs with gap bounded by 70 million, and this result has been improved to gaps of length 246 by a collaborative effort of the Polymath Project. Under the generalized Elliott–Halberstam conjecture this was improved to 6, extending earlier work by Maynard and Goldston, Pintz & Yıldırım.

Chen showed that there are infinitely many primes p (later called Chen primes) such that p + 2 is either a prime or a semiprime.

Legendre's conjecture
A table of maximal prime gaps shows that the conjecture holds to 264 ≈ 1.8. A counterexample near that size would require a prime gap a hundred million times the size of the average gap.

Near-square primes
Landau's fourth problem asked whether there are infinitely many primes which are of the form  for integer n. The existence of infinitely many such primes would follow as a consequence of other number-theoretic conjectures such as the Bunyakovsky conjecture and Bateman–Horn conjecture. , this problem is open.

One example of near-square primes are Fermat primes. Henryk Iwaniec showed that there are infinitely many numbers of the form  with at most two prime factors. Landau's conjecture is for the stronger . The best unconditional result is due to Harman & Lewis and it gives .

Merikoski, improving on previous works, showed that there are infinitely many numbers of the form  with greatest prime factor at least . Replacing the exponent with 2 would yield Landau's conjecture.

Hence almost all numbers of the form  are composite.

See also
List of unsolved problems in mathematics
Hilbert's problems

Notes

References

External links

Conjectures about prime numbers
Unsolved problems in number theory